Louis-Antoine-Marie Ledru Gaultier de Biauzat (1845-1886) was a French architect. He designed the market and schools in Clermont-Ferrand as well as the casino in Le Mont-Dore. He competed to design the spa in Le Mont-Dore, but Émile Camut's designs were chosen instead.

References

1845 births
1886 deaths
Architects from Clermont-Ferrand
19th-century French architects